USS Margaret (SP-531) was a schooner acquired by the U.S. Navy for temporary service during World War I.

World War I service

Margaret, a 58-gross-ton auxiliary schooner, was built in 1903 at Boston, Massachusetts, as the pleasure craft Savarona I. Acquired by the Navy for World War I service, she was commissioned in May 1917 as USS Margaret (SP-531) and renamed SP-531 the following year.

Post-war decommissioning

She was decommissioned and stricken from the Naval Vessel Register in September 1919 and sold on 13 December 1919.

References

External links
 Photo gallery at Naval Historical Center
 Photo gallery at Navsource.org

World War I auxiliary ships of the United States
Ships built in Boston
Schooners of the United States Navy
1903 ships